SLK (an acronym for So Low Key and Street Life Kings) were a British grime crew from Northwest London. Their debut single "Hype! Hype!", produced by Sticky and featuring Lady Envy, reached No. 22 on the UK Singles Chart and No. 3 on the UK Dance Singles Chart. In 2014, Complex magazine included the video for "Hype! Hype!" in their list of "15 Channel U Videos We Will Never Forget".

Members

SLK
 Flirta D
 Van Damage - also known as Adam B
 Ribz
 Skrapsta - also known as Skrapz
 Beenie Battleaxe
 BMD - also known as Big Man Diggy
 Big Mighty - also known as Tinster
 Shiesty Shadz
 Swarvo
 Skuffer - also known as SKU
 Infa Red
 Pimpstar
 DJ Vectra
 DJ Mondie
 DJ Policy - also known as Pistol P

Younger SLK
 J Money
 Blacks
 King Craze
 Vager
 Era Monster
 Iceman
 DJ Tallboy

References

External links

English hip hop groups
Grime music groups
Musical groups from London